The Central School of Art and Design was a public school of fine and applied arts in London, England. It offered foundation and degree level courses. It was established in 1896 by the London County Council as the Central School of Arts and Crafts. Central became part of the London Institute in 1986, and in 1989 merged with Saint Martin's School of Art to form Central Saint Martins College of Arts and Design.

History 
The Central School of Arts and Crafts was established in 1896 by the London County Council. It grew directly from the Arts and Crafts movement of William Morris and John Ruskin. The first principal – from 1896 to 1900 as co-principal with George Frampton – was the architect William Richard Lethaby, from 1896 until 1912; a blue plaque in his memory was erected in 1957. He was succeeded in 1912 by Fred Burridge.

The school was at first housed in Morley Hall, rented from the Regent Street Polytechnic. In 1908 it moved to purpose-built premises in Southampton Row, in the London Borough of Camden. In the same year the Royal Female School of Art, established in 1842, was merged into the school.

The Central School of Arts and Crafts was renamed the Central School of Art and Design on 1 May 1966. It became part of the London Institute in 1986, and in 1989 merged with Saint Martin's School of Art to form Central Saint Martins College of Arts and Design.

Alumni 

The alumni of the Central School of Art and Design include:

 Terence Conran, designer and writer, founder of Habitat
 Lucian Freud, painter
 Eric Gill, artist and typographer
 Kathleen Hale, artist and creator of Orlando the Marmalade Cat
 David Hicks, interior decorator and designer 
 Mike Leigh, film director, theatre director, writer
 Bill Moggridge, designer of the first laptop computer
 Victor Pasmore, abstract artist
 Vivian Stanshall, musician, of the Bonzo Dog Doo-Dah Band
 Joe Strummer, musician, of The Clash

References 

Art schools in London
Arts organizations established in the 1890s
Grade II* listed buildings in the London Borough of Camden
University of the Arts London
London County Council